PAN-AM (Pan-American) is a submarine telecommunications cable system connecting the west coast of South America and the Caribbean, crossing the continent through Panama. It has a bandwidth of 5 Gbit/s.

It has landing points in:
Arica, Arica Province, Arica y Parinacota Region, Chile
Lurin, Lima Region, Peru 
Punta Carnero, Guayas Province, Ecuador
Battery Pratt, Colón Province, Panama
Barranquilla, Atlántico Department, Colombia
Punto Fijo, Falcón State, Venezuela
Baby Beach, Aruba
St. Croix, U.S. Virgin Islands

See also 
 List of international submarine communications cables

References 

 

Submarine communications cables in the Caribbean Sea
Submarine communications cables in the Pacific Ocean